Aswat is an Emirati television program that first debuted in 2018 on MBC 1. The program aims to take the audience through a unique journey using strategies that promote knowledge of different centuries, technologies, the existing basic elements of life, and the causal relationships between these elements, leading them to recognize how important is reading in life.

Presenter 

The program is presented by Yasser Hareb, a writer and a prominent media figure from UAE. His books include Picasso and Starbucks, while his latest book, Take Off Your Shoes, contains a foreword by the international writer and novelist Paolo Coelho. Yasser previously presented the program Ma Kal Wa Dal over its five seasons, in addition to the scientific program Lahza, which were presented its second season on MBC television in 2017. He is also a prominent figure in the cultural and intellectual activities in the region, and has many and varied contributions to social media.

References 

Middle East Broadcasting Center
2010s in Emirati television